Nagyasakya Dam, is an earthfill dam on Panzan river near Nandgaon, Nashik district in the state of Maharashtra in India.

Specifications

Purpose
 Irrigation

See also
 Dams in Maharashtra
 List of reservoirs and dams in India

References

Dams in Nashik district
Dams completed in 1992
1992 establishments in Maharashtra